Ancistrogobius is a genus of gobies native to the western Pacific Ocean. The first fossil record of this genus is Ancistrogobius indicus (only otoliths known) from the Burdigalian of southwestern India.

Species
There are currently four recognized species in this genus:
 Ancistrogobius dipus Shibukawa, Yoshino & G. R. Allen, 2010 (Double-fin cheek-hook goby)
 Ancistrogobius squamiceps Shibukawa, Yoshino & G. R. Allen, 2010 (Scaly cheek-hook goby)
 Ancistrogobius yanoi Shibukawa, Yoshino & G. R. Allen, 2010 (Yano's cheek-hook goby)
 Ancistrogobius yoshigoui Shibukawa, Yoshino & G. R. Allen, 2010 (Threadless cheek-hook goby)
 Ancistrogobius indicus Carolin, Bajpai, Maurya & Schwarzhans, 2022 (fossil)

References

Gobiidae